Roy Nissany (born 30 November 1994) is an Israeli racing driver who is currently competing in the Formula 2 Championship with PHM Racing by Charouz. He is also currently a Formula 1 test driver with Williams Grand Prix Engineering. He is the son of former racing driver Chanoch Nissany.

Personal life 
Nissany was born in Tel Aviv, Israel, and resides in Herzliya, Israel.  He is the son of the former Israeli one-time Minardi Formula One test driver, Chanoch Nissany. Nissany races under the flag of his native Israel, however he also holds a French passport.

Career

Karting
Nissany began karting at the age of six. In 2004, he drove for the Hungarian G-Kart Racing Team, and finished fourth overall in the FIA Central European Zone Trophy and in the Hungarian Karting Championship. In 2007, Nissany drove for the Italian Morsicani Racing Team, racing in the Italian Open Masters and 13th Winter Cup in Lonato del Garda. In the following year, he raced for the Gandolfi Racing Team and scored a best finish of second in the Mille Dollari race in Pomposa.

Junior formulae
Nissany began his car racing career in 2010, finishing eighth in the 2010 Formula Lista Junior championship and scoring a pole position at Monza. In 2011, he moved to the ADAC Formel Masters series (now ADAC Formula 4) for the Mücke Motorsport team, racing against drivers such as Pascal Wehrlein and Artem Markelov. He finished the season in 11th place, scoring two podium finishes. Nissany competed again in 2012, finishing in ninth place and scoring one win at the Red Bull Ring.

Formula 3 European Championship

2013 
In 2013 Nissany moved up to the FIA Formula 3 European Championship with Mücke Motorsport alongside future IndyCar driver Felix Rosenqvist. Nissany scored 11 points including two eighth-place finishes, and ended the season 22nd in the championship.

2014 
He competed again in 2014 alongside Rosenqvist and Lucas Auer. Nissany finished 17th in the championship with 26 points, his best race result being sixth place at the Nürburgring.

Formula Renault 3.5 Series

2015 
In 2015 Nissany moved to the Formula Renault 3.5 Series with Tech 1 Racing alongside Aurélien Panis. Nissany took a podium finish with third place at the Red Bull Ring, and ended the season 13th in the championship with 27 points to Panis' 42.

2016 
He moved to Lotus for the 2016 season alongside René Binder. Nissany's 2016 season was more successful; he claimed three pole positions, three race wins and four further podium finishes to end the season fourth in the championship, ahead of Binder and behind future Formula 2 competitor Louis Delétraz.

2017 
Nissany then moved to RP Motorsport for 2017 as the series became the World Series Formula V8 3.5. Nissany was one of only eight full-time drivers in the series, which folded the following year due to a lack of entries. Nissany had another successful season, winning a race at the Circuito de Jerez and claiming five more podium places to finish fifth in the championship.

FIA Formula 2 Championship

2018 
In 2018, Nissany competed in the FIA Formula 2 Championship with Campos Vexatec Racing. After the tenth round in Monza, Nissany had scored only a single point – a 10th-place finish at the feature race at Spa-Francorchamps. In contrast, teammate Luca Ghiotto had collected 94 points including four podium finishes. Nissany was then replaced by Roberto Merhi for the remaining two rounds of the season.

2019 
Nissany suffered a training injury at the beginning of 2019 and did not compete in racing during the year.

2020 
In 2020 he returned to Formula 2 to race for Trident Racing alongside Marino Sato. Nissany scored a point in the opening race at the Red Bull Ring, finishing 10th. His next points finish came at the thirteenth race of the season, the feature race at Spa-Francorchamps, where he finished eighth. This put Nissany on reverse-grid pole position for the sprint race, however he was forced to retire from the race after a collision with fellow Williams Driver Academy member Dan Ticktum. Nissany ended the season 19th in the drivers' championship, scoring five of his team's six points that year. In December 2020, Nissany drove for DAMS in the post-season Formula 2 test at the Bahrain International Circuit.

2021 
In January 2021 it was confirmed that Nissany would move to DAMS for the  season, driving alongside Ferrari Driver Academy member Marcus Armstrong. Nissany qualified seventh for the Monaco round, his best Formula 2 qualifying position. This put him fourth on the grid for the opening sprint race, and an oil leak for Christian Lundgaard during the race elevated Nissany to third place and allowed him to claim his first Formula 2 podium finish. Unfortunately for Nissany, his only other points finish came in Monza, as he ended up 16th in the championship.

2022  
Nissany remained with DAMS for a second season, partnering F3 graduate Ayumu Iwasa. Starting the season out at Bahrain, he finished eighth in the feature race, scoring his first points of the season. More points followed in Jeddah, before Nissany qualified sixth in Imola. After taking fourth in the sprint race, Nissany made a sublime start on Sunday, taking the lead going into the first corner. He would ultimately lose his chance of victory, crashing at the final corner on lap 20. He came back with a point at Barcelona, however from this point, Nissany would go three events without finishing in the points. The Israeli driver broke his duck in Austria, taking ninth place in the feature race, and he would score the same result in France. Following the accumulation of 12 penalty points by the conclusion of the round at Zandvoort, he received a ban for the following event in Monza. Nissany returned to action for the season finale at Yas Marina, where he qualified second and finished in the points in both races, leading him to conclude the campaign sitting 19th in the standings.

2023 
During the 2022 post-season testing, Nissany reunited with Charouz Racing System. Shortly after, he was announced for the team for the 2023 season, under the new name PHM Racing by Charouz.

Formula One

Nissany had his first experience with a Formula One car in October 2014, testing the Sauber C31 at the Circuito Ricardo Tormo. In December 2019, he took part in post-season testing with Williams at Yas Marina Circuit. In January 2020 it was announced that Williams had appointed Nissany as their official test driver for the  season. He later appeared in FP1 sessions at the Italian and Bahrain Grands Prix, as well as representing Williams at the post-season young driver test at Yas Marina Circuit.

Nissany was retained by Williams in his test driver role for the  season. He took part in the first day of pre-season testing with the team, recording 83 laps of the Bahrain International Circuit. He appeared in three FP1 sessions with Williams during the season, at the Spanish, French and Austrian Grands Prix.

Nissany remained a member of the Williams Driver Academy for the  season.

Racing record

Karting career summary

Racing career summary 

* Season still in progress.

Complete Formula Lista Junior results 
(key) (Races in bold indicate pole position) (Races in italics indicate fastest lap)

Complete ADAC Formel Masters results 
(key) (Races in bold indicate pole position) (Races in italics indicate fastest lap)

Complete FIA Formula 3 European Championship results 
(key) (Races in bold indicate pole position) (Races in italics indicate fastest lap)

Complete World Series Formula V8 3.5 results 
(key) (Races in bold indicate pole position) (Races in italics indicate fastest lap)

Complete FIA Formula 2 Championship results
(key) (Races in bold indicate pole position) (Races in italics indicate points for the fastest lap of top ten finishers)

Complete Formula One participations

Complete F3 Asian Championship results
(key) (Races in bold indicate pole position) (Races in italics indicate fastest lap)

Photos

See also
List of select Jewish racing drivers

References

External links 

 
 

1994 births
Sportspeople from Tel Aviv
Israeli racing drivers
Israeli Jews
Jewish sportspeople
Living people
ADAC Formel Masters drivers
FIA Formula 3 European Championship drivers
FIA Institute Young Driver Excellence Academy drivers
World Series Formula V8 3.5 drivers
FIA Formula 2 Championship drivers
F3 Asian Championship drivers
Mücke Motorsport drivers
Tech 1 Racing drivers
Charouz Racing System drivers
RP Motorsport drivers
Campos Racing drivers
Trident Racing drivers
Hitech Grand Prix drivers
DAMS drivers
Formula Lista Junior drivers
PHM Racing drivers